Abronia alpina is a rare species of flowering plant in the four o'clock family known by the common names Ramshaw Meadows sand verbena and Ramshaw Meadows abronia. It is endemic to Tulare County, California, where it is known from only one area high in the Sierra Nevada.

Description
This is a small, squat perennial herb which forms a flat to mounded mat on the floor of alpine meadow habitat. The leaves have rounded blades each less than a centimeter long at the ends of short petioles. The foliage and stems are fuzzy and glandular. The plant blooms in clusters of up to five white to pink or lavender flowers around a centimeter wide and long.

Further reading

References

External links
Jepson Manual Treatment for Abronia alpina
USDA Plants Profile for Abronia alpina
U.S.FWS Species Account
UC CalPhotos gallery of Abronia alpina

alpina
Endemic flora of California
Flora of the Sierra Nevada (United States)
Natural history of Tulare County, California
Taxa named by Townshend Stith Brandegee
Plants described in 1899